One Tree Hill is an American television series created by Mark Schwahn, who has also written over a third of the episodes, including each season's premiere and season finale. Schwahn shares executive producer duties with Joe Davola, Greg Prange, Mike Tollin, and Brian Robbins. It is produced by Tollin/Robbins Productions and Warner Bros. Television. 

The series stars Chad Michael Murray and James Lafferty as half-brothers Lucas Scott and Nathan Scott, respectively, with Hilarie Burton, Bethany Joy Lenz, Sophia Bush, Lee Norris, and Antwon Tanner playing the parts of Peyton Sawyer, Haley James Scott, Brooke Davis, Marvin "Mouth" McFadden, and Antwon "Skills" Taylor. 

From 2003 to 2006, the first three seasons of One Tree Hill originally aired on The WB before it merged with UPN to form The CW, which the show later aired until 2012. Eighty-eight episodes were produced during the first four seasons; due to the 2007–2008 Writers Guild of America strike, the fifth season consisted of only 18 episodes.

With the exception of the pilot, episode titles are named after the title of a song. Over the course of nine seasons, One Tree Hill aired a total of 187 episodes.

Series overview

Episodes

Season 1 (2003–04)

Season 2 (2004–05)

Season 3 (2005–06)

Season 4 (2006–07)

Season 5 (2008)

Season 6 (2008–09)

Season 7 (2009–10)

Season 8 (2010–11)

Season 9 (2012)

Ratings

References

External links
Summary of episodes from The CW
List of One Tree Hill episodes at the Internet Movie Database

onetreehillweb.net

 
Lists of American teen drama television series episodes

it:One Tree Hill#Episodi

no:One Tree Hill#Episoder